Jarabulus District is a district of Aleppo Governorate in northern Syria, on the border with Turkey. The administrative centre is the city of Jarabulus.

At the 2004 census, the district had a population of 58,889. Ethnically, it is mostly composed of Arabs and Turkmens but also includes Kurds, who settled in the area during the 17th century. 

The Euphrates river enters Syria from Turkey in Jarabulus.

Subdistricts
The district of Jarabulus is divided into two subdistricts or nawāḥī (population as of 2004):

References

 
Districts of Aleppo Governorate